In antiquity, Cook Islanders practiced Cook Islands mythology, before widespread conversion by the London Missionary Society during the nineteenth century. In modern times, the Cook Islands are predominantly Christian, with the largest denomination being the Cook Islands Christian Church.

History

Pre-European contact 

The Cook Islands were settled at some point between 900 and 1200 CE by Polynesian settlers, who brought with them Polynesian mythology. Over the following centuries, this developed distinctive characteristics in the islands, forming a unique mythology local to the islands. Legends and stories were passed down in an oral tradition through songs and chants. On the island of Rarotonga, the physical landscape was heavily tied to religion, with all marae (sacred buildings) constructed oriented towards Ara Metua, the ancient road around the island.

Cook Islands mythology included Avaiki, the ancestral homeland and land of the gods; heroes such as Nganaoa; and gods & goddesses including Avatea, Ina, Marama, Papa, Rongo and Tangaroa.

Missionary activity and spread of Christianity 

In 1821, John Williams of the London Missionary Society landed at Aitutaki and began using Tahitian converts to spread Christianity. In 1823, John and his wife Mary were on the first European vessel to officially sight Rarotonga, the Endeavour. In 1834 the couple returned to Britain to supervise the printing of the New Testament of the Bible in Cook Islands Māori. John was killed in Vanuatu in 1839, and a memorial stone was erected to him in Rarotonga that same year.

Williams had become the first recorded Reverend of the Cook Islands in 1821, at Arutanga on Aitutaki. In 1828, the London Missionary Society constructed a church in that location that is the oldest church in the Cook Islands. The Society established the Cook Islands LMS Church in 1852; in 1968 the church was renamed the Cook Islands Christian Church and made autonomous by the Cook Islands Christian Church Incorporation Act. The Cook Islands Christian Church is a Reformed Protestant Church, which has been very successful in the islands and today accounts for almost half of Cook Islanders. Other Christian denominations including Catholicism, Mormonism, Adventism and Pentecostalism have had some success in the Cook Islands as well.

Demographics 

The majority of Cook Islanders are Protestant Christians, with almost half of the islands' population being members of the Cook Islands Christian Church. Catholicism and Pentecostalism are also present, as are Mormons and Jehovah's Witnesses. Non-Christian faiths including Hinduism, Buddhism and Islam are found in small numbers mostly among non-indigenous inhabitants.

According to the 2016 Cook Islands census:

According to the CIA World Factbook:

See also 
 Mythology of the Cook Islands
 Culture of the Cook Islands
 Demographics of the Cook Islands

References 

Cook Islands culture
Religion in the Cook Islands
Demographics of the Cook Islands
Geography of the Cook Islands